Leiorhynx is a genus of moths of the family Erebidae. The genus was erected by George Hampson in 1902.

Species
Leiorhynx argentifascia Hampson, 1902 Botswana, Zimbabwe, Namibia, South Africa
Leiorhynx atrirena de Joannis, 1913 Eritrea

References

Calpinae